Murwillumbah Soccer Club is a semi-professional soccer club based in New South Wales, Australia. The club was founded in 1954 and its home ground is the Jim Devine Field in the suburb of Murwillumbah. Despite the club being based in New South Wales, the club's senior men's side formally competed within the Gold Coast Premier League. The club last fielded a senior men's team within the Football Queensland competitions sometime within the late 2010s.

The club has been known under the names Murwillumbah Wanderers and Murwillumbah United.

Honours
Seasons in bold indicate doubles with both the respective premiership and championship in a single season.

Football South Coast 

 Gold Coast Premier League (first-tier)
 Premiership
 Winners (1): 2013
 FQPL 2 − South Coast / Men's Coast League 1 / Division 1 (second-tier)
 Premiership
 Winners (3): 2005, 2012, 2022
 Championship
 Winners (2): 1988, 2012

External links
Club Website
Club Facebook

Soccer clubs in New South Wales
Association football clubs established in 1954
1954 establishments in Australia
Sport in Tweed Heads, New South Wales